Paul O'Grady's Animal Orphans is a British documentary series which sees presenter Paul O'Grady travel to South Africa, Zambia and Borneo, meeting some of the animals that have been orphaned in the wild.

The first series aired from 14–28 January 2014, whilst the second series aired from 20 January–3 February 2015 on ITV. The third and final series of Animal Orphans aired for two episodes on 14 & 21 April 2016.

Transmissions
Official viewing figures are from BARB.

References

External links
Official Twitter

2010s British documentary television series
2014 British television series debuts
2016 British television series endings
English-language television shows
ITV (TV network) original programming
Television series by ITV Studios
Television series about animals
Paul O'Grady